Blasto is a platforming third-person shooter game developed by Sony Interactive Studios America and published by Sony Computer Entertainment for the Sony PlayStation in 1998. Phil Hartman voiced Captain Blasto, an extremely muscular, alien-fighting, dimwitted captain.

Gameplay
The game is a third-person action/platformer/shooter. The enemies are aliens that teleport in around the player based on events that are triggered as the player explores the environment. The game has a strong platforming factor, with elements such as rotating 3D sections which have to be navigated while shooting at aliens. Puzzle elements tend to be limited to simple "find the switch to proceed" scenarios. However, some of the elements within the game require the player to utilize different weaponry in certain situations in order to advance to the next area. Blasto is one of the few PlayStation games to use both control sticks. The left stick offers better movement control than the D-Pad and the right stick can be used to adjust the player's aim.

Plot
After returning from the 5th dimension, the diabolical alien tyrant named Bosc is bent on conquering the Planet Uranus with his own army and attempts to invade and destroy Earth as well. He is seeking to reign supreme for his power of the solar system that includes his alien army capturing and enslaving the Space Babes throughout the galaxy. Thus, Captain Blasto is the only hero who can foil him and his evil ambitions and set out to rescue the stranded Space Babes along the way. Blasto is also the only type of hero who doesn't mind catching Space Babes in distress every now and then, especially when it comes to exploring and venturing across through the Planet Uranus.

Development and release
Though it was not announced until the June 1997 Electronic Entertainment Expo, Blasto had been secretly in development since 1995.

Wanting the game to be free of load times, the development team made the game stream constantly off the CD. This made it impossible to use Red Book audio, so the music had to be done in MIDI format.

None of the PlayStation's graphics libraries were used for the game, with the developers instead using custom tools and low-level programming to bring models built in Alias directly into the game. Another custom tool enabled the designers to track which parts of the game world were most heavily trafficked by playtesters, so that they could tweak level design to either redirect players towards specific areas or move important elements from widely ignored areas to more heavily trafficked ones.

Instead of texture mapping, vertex lighting was used to give color and definition to the floors. Because vertex lighting is a time-consuming process for artists, Sony gave the Blasto team carte blanche in taking artists from other teams to get the project completed on time.

Producer and designer Jonathan Beard stated that the game's protagonist Captain Blasto was conceived as a parody of heroes such as Flash Gordon and Buck Rogers but with a comedic amount of overconfidence. Lead artist Ben Harrison described the character as an amalgamation of Duck Dodgers, Powdered Toast Man, and Dirty Harry. Actor and comedian Phil Hartman provided the voice for the game's eponymous hero. While developing the character, Beard claimed the team had Hartman in mind while coming up with his voice. Hartman stated he spent six hours recording all of the protagonist's possible dialogue during a single-day session.

Initially announced for a late 1997 release, Blasto was later pushed back to the first quarter of 1998. Sony did not provide a specific reason for the delay.

The game also had a Japanese release planned as advertised via a promo video included on Dengeki PlayStation D14 under the name , but was cancelled for unknown reasons.

In the version of the title released in PAL regions, the original episode (level) 3 was removed due to space limitations, since the PAL version included a number of languages.

Reception

The game received "mixed" reviews according to the review aggregation website GameRankings. Next Generation said of the game, "In the end, despite all the problems, this isn't the worst game ever released for PlayStation, but it doesn't hold a candle to the best, or even the mediocre."

References

External links

1998 video games
3D platform games
PlayStation (console) games
PlayStation (console)-only games
Sony Interactive Entertainment games
Third-person shooters
Video games developed in the United States